Alexander William MacDougall (19 March 1837 – 1 November 1917) was an English first-class cricketer. MacDougall's batting style is unknown. He was born at Kingston, Jamaica.

MacDougall made a single first-class appearance for Nottinghamshire against Surrey in 1858 at The Oval. He was dismissed for 3 runs in Nottinghamshire's first-innings by William Caffyn, while in their second-innings he was dismissed for a duck by Frederick Miller, with Surrey winning the match by 9 wickets. This was his only major appearance for Nottinghamshire.

According to the 1871 and 1881 Census, he lived at Battlefields House, Bath.

He died at Greenwich, London on 1 November 1917.

References

1837 births
1917 deaths
Cricketers from Kingston, Jamaica
English cricketers
Nottinghamshire cricketers